The LKL IV and LKL V were a pair of very similar Polish parasol wing two-seaters, built in the early 1930s. They differed primarily in their engines.

Design and development

Members of the Lublin Airport Club (Lubelski Klub Lotnitczy in Polish, hence LKL) began to design a pair of parasol wing, two-seat aircraft for the Club's use in 1931. They differed chiefly in their engines and the lengths and the cowlings associated with them, though there were also undercarriage design variations. The LKL IV had a  aircooled, four-cylinder upright inline engine and was first flown in the autumn of 1932. The LKL V was powered by a  Warner Scarab seven-cylinder radial engine and flew a few weeks later.

The wooden wing was rectangular in plan out to rounded tips and was in two parts, each  built around twin spars and fabric covered. They were braced by pairs of parallel faired struts from the lower fuselage longerons to the spars and the central join was held above the fuselage on a cabane of steel transverse inverted V-struts.

Because the Cirrus was an upright engine, its enclosing cowling raised the nose ahead of the cockpit, though the underside sloped upwards. A long exhaust on the port side exited low on the fuselage under the wing. The radial Scarab of the LKL V allowed a lower nose; its cylinders were enclosed by a Townend ring-type housing. Because of the more compact radial, the LKL V was  shorter than the LKL IV and was also  had a slightly lower empty weight. Fuel tanks were in the fuselage. Behind the engines the fuselages were rectangular in section, built around welded steel tube structures and largely fabric-covered. There were two tandem open cockpits with dual controls under the wing, which had a rounded cut-out in its trailing edge.

Their tail surfaces were fabric-covered wooden framed structures. The tailplanes were mounted on top of the slender rear fuselage and strut-braced from below and their fins were small, with a cropped triangular profile and carrying full, rounded balanced rudders.  Both had divided-type, fixed, conventional landing gear with half-axles and with radius rods from the lower fuselage longerons. There were differences in the forward, shock absorbing legs; the LKL IV had oleo struts from the upper longerons and the LKL V had faired, compressed rubber legs from the bases of the forward wing struts. In 1934 the LKL IV's undercarriage was shortened, though without changing the geometry.

Operational history

Both aircraft were used by the LKL for several years and flown in local competitions. The LKL V continued to fly until autumn 1936.

Variants
LKL IV  Cirrus III engine
LKL V  Warner Scarab engine

Specifications (LKL IV)

References

Single-engined tractor aircraft
1930s Polish civil utility aircraft